Lê Phổ (2 August 1907 – 12 December 2001) was a Vietnamese painter. From 1925 until 1930, Le Pho studied at the Ecole des Beaux-Arts of Hanoi. At this point, he earned a scholarship to study at the École des Beaux-Arts in Paris, and he studied there for the next two years under the instruction of Victor Tardieu, a friend and companion of Henri Matisse. Upon returning to Vietnam he taught at the École Supérieure des Beaux Arts de l'Indochine in Hanoi.

In 1937, he gave up his professorship to return to Paris as a part of the International Exposition in Paris as both a delegate and a member of the exposition's jury. In 1938, he had his first one-man show in Paris, a show which marked the beginning of his successful artistic career in Europe. He would go on to show his art across France in Paris, Nice, Lyon, and Rouen, as well as in Morocco, Brussels in Europe, and in New York.

Le Pho's work is often divided into three distinct styles. The first style is from his period in Hanoi, and on to his first couple years in Paris. In works from this period we see depictions of the Vietnamese landscape of Le Pho's youth, paintings steeped with nostalgia and the historical magnificence of the country. Following this style came what is commonly known as Le Pho's Romanet period, named after the French gallery owner who became Le Pho's major promoter. This period would last until the 1960s. In 1963, Le Pho's work was noticed by the American gallerist Wally Findlay, owner of Findlay galleries, who ordered many of his canvases and sold them to the American market, marking the beginning of Le Pho's final artistic period, his Findlay Period. This is perhaps his most recognizable period, where he produced more works in oil on canvas and featured his distinctly depicted Vietnamese women surrounded by lush landscapes. Many people consider the strong shifts in medium, subject, and style between these three periods to be a testament to Le Pho's versatility as an artist.

Though he travelled for his shows, he continued to call Paris his home from 1937 until the time of his death in 2001. He was one of four EBAI graduates who made a career in Paris, including Mai Trung Thứ, Vũ Cao Đàm and female painter Lê Thị Lựu. He painted scenery of Vietnam, still life with flowers, family settings and portraits. Vietnamese women, most often portrayed as elongated figures evoking the influence of surrealism, are a recurrent theme in his work.

References

External links 
Biography of Artist Le Pho
Le Pho Website
Le Pho Bio - Findlay Galleries
Pocock Fine Art Gallery specializes in the artist's paintings on the secondary market. 
Harmony in Green: The two sisters

1907 births
Artists of Vietnamese descent
French people of Vietnamese descent
2001 deaths
20th-century Vietnamese painters